Alto Palena Airport is an airport serving Palena, a small town in the mountains of the Los Lagos Region of Chile. The airport is just north of the town, and south of a bend in the Palena River.

There are downslopes past the short overruns of both ends of the runway. There is nearby mountainous terrain in all quadrants, and hills are close to both east and west approach paths.

See also

Transport in Chile
List of airports in Chile

References

External links
Alto Palena Airport at OpenStreetMap
Alto Palena Airport at OurAirports

Alto Palena Airport at FallingRain

Airports in Los Lagos Region